It Remains to Be Seen is a single-movement composition for orchestra by the American composer Nico Muhly.  The work was commissioned by the Boston University Tanglewood Institute for their 40th Anniversary Gala Concert.  It was premiered in July 2006 by the BUTI orchestra under the conductor James Gaffigan.

Composition
It Remains to Be Seen has a duration of roughly 11 minutes and is composed in a single movement.  Muhly described the inspiration for the piece in the score program notes, writing:

Instrumentation
The work is scored for an orchestra comprising piccolo, three flutes, two oboes, English horn, two clarinets, bass clarinet, two bassoons, contrabassoon, four horns, four trumpets, two trombones, bass trombone, tuba, timpani, four percussionists (glockenspiel, two octaves of crotales, marimba, vibraphone, sandpaper blocks, bass drum, crash cymbals, tambourine, large tam-tam, tenor drum, triangle, wood block), two harps, piano, strings.

Reception
Will Robin of NewMusicBox called the piece "a lovely, loving orchestral work that pays tribute to his wistful nighttime walk from the Tanglewood main grounds back to West Campus following a concert."

References

Compositions by Nico Muhly
2006 compositions
Compositions for symphony orchestra